Fred John Bohri (August 20, 1870 – April 9, 1934) was an American businessman and politician.

Born in Fountain City, Buffalo County, Wisconsin, Bohri graduated from the Winona High School in Winona, Minnesota. He married Augusta Schuster (1871–1954) in 1897. He was a merchant and grain dealer. Bohri also involved with the First State Bank of Fountain City serving as president, vice president, and cashier. Bohri served on the Fountain City Common Council and was mayor of the city. He also served as treasurer of the Fountain City School Board and served on the Buffalo County Board of Supervisors. Bohri served in the Wisconsin State Assembly in 1905 and was active in the Republican Party. In 1934, Bohri died in a hospital in Rochester, Minnesota following surgery. He was 63 years old.

Notes

1870 births
1934 deaths
People from Fountain City, Wisconsin
Businesspeople from Wisconsin
School board members in Wisconsin
County supervisors in Wisconsin
Mayors of places in Wisconsin
Wisconsin city council members
Republican Party members of the Wisconsin State Assembly